Ann O'Connor (born 3 June 1952) is a female Irish former swimmer.

Swimming career
O'Connor competed at the 1968 Summer Olympics and the 1972 Summer Olympics. At the ASA National British Championships she won the 110 yards breaststroke title in 1969.

References

1952 births
Living people
Irish female swimmers
Olympic swimmers of Ireland
Swimmers at the 1968 Summer Olympics
Swimmers at the 1972 Summer Olympics
Sportspeople from Dublin (city)
Female breaststroke swimmers
20th-century Irish women